Maha Thammaracha (literally "Great Dharmic King"), or the extended version Maha Thammarachathirat ("Great Dharmic King of High Kings"), was a Thai exalted title given to the Buddha. The title was also occupied by monarchs of Sukhothai, an ancient kingdom in Thailand, and may refer:

 Maha Thammaracha I, also known as Li Thai
 Maha Thammaracha II
 Maha Thammaracha III, also known as Sai Lue Thai
 Maha Thammaracha IV, also known as Ban Mueang
 Maha Thammaracha (king of Ayutthaya)

See also
 Buddhist kingship
 Chakravartin
 Chatrapati
 Dharmaraja (disambiguation)
 Devaraja

Thai royal titles